Snug is a minor character from William Shakespeare's play A Midsummer Night's Dream. He is a joiner who comes from Athens who is hired by Peter Quince to play the part of the lion in Pyramus and Thisbe. When he is first assigned the part, he is afraid it may take him a while to finally remember his lines (even though the lion's role was nothing but roaring originally). Bottom offers to play the part of the lion (as he offers to play all other parts), but he is rejected by Quince, who worries (as do the other characters) that his loud and ferocious roar in the play will frighten the ladies of power in the audience and get Quince and all his actors hanged. In the end, the lion's part is revised to explain that he is in fact not a lion and means the audience no harm.

Snug is often played as a stupid man, a manner describing almost all of the Mechanicals.

Snug is the only Mechanical to whom the playwright did not assign a first name.

On the Elizabethan stage, the role of Snug and the other Mechanicals was intended to be doubled with Titania's four fairy escorts: Moth, Mustardseed, Cobweb, and Peaseblossom.

References

Sources

See also
 Mechanical (character)

Male Shakespearean characters
Characters in A Midsummer Night's Dream
Fictional artisans
Fictional actors
Literary characters introduced in 1596
Fictional Greek people